Prochyliza is a genus of waltzing flies in the family Piophilidae. There are about 11 described species in Prochyliza.

Species
These 11 species belong to the genus Prochyliza:
 Prochyliza azteca McAlpine, 1977
 Prochyliza brevicornis Melander, 1924
 Prochyliza georgekaplani Martin-Vega
 Prochyliza ignifera
 Prochyliza inca McAlpine, 1977
 Prochyliza lundbecki (Duda, 1924)
 Prochyliza nigricornis (Meigen, 1826)
 Prochyliza nigricoxa (Melander & Spuler, 1917)
 Prochyliza nigrimana (Meigen, 1826)
 Prochyliza varipes (Meigen, 1830)
 Prochyliza xanthostoma Walker, 1849

References

Further reading

 

Piophilidae
Articles created by Qbugbot
Tephritoidea genera